Piz Madlain is a mountain in the Sesvenna Range of the Alps, overlooking S-charl in the Swiss canton of Graubünden.

References

External links
 Piz Madlain on Hikr

Mountains of the Alps
Mountains of Switzerland
Alpine three-thousanders
Mountains of Graubünden
Scuol